Bythopirellula is a genus of bacteria from the family of Planctomycetaceae with two known species. Bythopirellula goksoyri has been isolated from deep sea iron hydroxide deposits from the Arctic Mid-Ocean Ridge.

See also 
 List of bacterial orders
 List of bacteria genera

References

Bacteria genera
Monotypic bacteria genera